The 2023 Rugby World Cup will be the tenth men's Rugby World Cup, the quadrennial world championship for rugby union national teams. It is scheduled to take place in France from 8 September to 28 October 2023 in nine venues across the country. The opening match and final will take place at the Stade de France, in the commune of Saint-Denis, north of Paris. The tournament will take place in the bicentenary year of the "invention" of the sport by William Webb Ellis.

Originally, the tournament was scheduled to last the typical six weeks; however, on 23 February 2021, World Rugby announced an additional week to accommodate the additional rest day requirement for player welfare. This means that teams will have a minimum of five rest days for all matches, optimising recovery and preparation for the tournament. It will be the third time France has hosted the Rugby World Cup, having previously hosted the 2007 Rugby World Cup, as well as the 1991 Rugby World Cup as joint hosts with England, Ireland, Scotland and Wales. It precedes the 2024 Summer Olympics in Paris and will take place less than a year before the Olympic opening ceremony.

The defending champions are South Africa, who defeated England 32–12 in the 2019 final.

Chile will make its first ever appearance at the Rugby World Cup, and Portugal will return for its second appearance, after 16 years.

Host country selection 
World Rugby requested that any members wishing to host the 2023 event were to submit an expression of interest by June 2015. A total of six unions responded. The Italian Rugby Federation were among the members interested, but withdrew from their bid on 28 September 2016. The Argentine Rugby Union and USA Rugby both expressed their interest in hosting the event but ultimately decided against a formal bid. Three bids were officially submitted to World Rugby by the June 2017 deadline.

On 15 November 2017, the French Rugby Federation bid was chosen ahead of bids by the South African Rugby Union and the Irish Rugby Football Union. France had launched its bid on 9 February 2017.

Venues 
On 17 March 2017, twelve host cities were selected. This list was later reduced to nine cities (excluding Paris, Montpellier and Lens):

a Stadium/site used in 2007 Rugby World Cup.
b Stadium/site used in 1999 Rugby World Cup.

Team base camps 
{| class="wikitable"
|-
!colspan="2"| National squads' base camps
|-

|}

Qualifying 

Twenty teams are set to compete. A total of 12 teams gained automatic qualification for the tournament after finishing in the top three of their pool at the 2019 Rugby World Cup, which included France already automatically qualified as host. The remaining eight spaces were decided by regional competitions followed by a few cross-regional play-offs.

Spain originally qualified as Europe 2, but Romania lodged an official complaint that Spain had fielded an ineligible player during the qualifying tournament. After a controversial investigation, it was concluded that the player in question had falsified his passport: Spain received a deduction of 10 points, resulting in them being effectively ejected from the competition, with Romania replacing them as Europe 2 and Portugal taking Romania's spot in the repechage tournament.

On 18 November 2022, Portugal won the repechage tournament to be the last country to qualify for the 2023 Rugby World Cup. It was the first time that Canada did not qualify for the Rugby World Cup, the first time since 1995 that the United States did not qualify, and the first time three teams from South America qualified. This is the first Rugby World Cup without any participation from North America.

The below table shows the qualified teams as of 18 November 2022:

¹as of 21 November 2022

Draw 
The pool draw took place on 14 December 2020 in Paris. The draw returned to its traditional place of the year following the previous World Cup, after the end-of-year internationals.

The seeding system from previous Rugby World Cups was retained with the 12 automatic qualifiers from 2019 being allocated to their respective bands based on their World Rugby Rankings on 1 January 2020:

 Band 1: The four highest-ranked teams
 Band 2: The next four highest-ranked teams
 Band 3: The final four directly qualified teams

The remaining two bands were made up of the eight qualifying teams, with allocation to each band being based on the previous Rugby World Cup playing strength:
 Band 4: – Oceania 1, Europe 1, Americas 1, Asia/Pacific 1
 Band 5: – Africa 1, Europe 2, Americas 2, Final Qualifier Winner
This meant the 20 teams, qualified and qualifiers, were seeded thus (world ranking as of 1 January 2020):

Pool stage

Pool A

Pool B

Pool C

Pool D

Knockout stage 
The knockout stage will consist of three single-elimination rounds culminating in a final and a third-place playoff. Following a tie in regulation time, two 10-minute periods of extra time will be used to determine a winner. If the scores are tied at the end of extra time, an additional 10-minute "sudden death" period is played, with the first team to score any points being the winner. If the score remains tied at the end of extra time, a kicking competition will ensue.

Quarter-finals

Semi-finals

Bronze final

Final

Broadcasting 
  – TF1 Group, France 2 et M6
  – Ziggo Sport
  – SuperSport
  – ITV
  – NBC Sports
  – Stan Sport (all matches) and Nine Network (all Australia matches and the final)
  – RAI and Sky Sport Italia
  – Sky Sport (New Zealand)

See also 

 History of the Rugby World Cup
 2023 Rugby World Cup warm-up matches

References

External links 

 
2023
2023 in rugby union
2023–24 in French rugby union
International rugby union competitions hosted by France
World Cup 2023
Rugby World Cup
Rugby World Cup